The  was a Japanese jet fighter-attacker project designed during the final stages of World War II but which was never completed.

Development
The Nakajima Kikka had been inspired by the successful German Messerschmitt Me 262, but the similarities to that aircraft were limited to the general configuration. On the other hand, the design team led by Iwao Shibuya based the Karyū far more closely on the German aircraft, which had already proven itself quite formidable.

The Ki-201 project was ordered by the Imperial Japanese Army between October and December 1944, with the Army laying out a performance requirement of an 800~1,000 km/h top speed, 12,000 meter practical ceiling, and 800~1,000 km range. The design was advanced by Nakajima during 1945 and the basic drawings were completed in June.

Nakajima anticipated the completion of the first Karyū by December 1945, and the first 18 units by March 1946. Most sources agree that work on the first prototype had not yet begun by the time of the Japanese surrender.

Specifications (planned specification)

See also

References

Notes

Bibliography

  (new edition 1987 by Putnam Aeronautical Books, .)* Green, William. War Planes of the Second World War: Fighters, Volume Three. London: Macdonald, 1961 (Seventh impression 1973). .
 Mikesh, Robert C. Kikka, Monogram  Close-Up 19. Bolyston, Massachusetts: Monogram Aviation Publications, 1979. .
 Unknown Author. Famous Aircraft of the World, first series, no.76: Japanese Army Experimental Fighters (1). Japan: Bunrin-Do Co. Ltd., August 1976.

External links

 The Nakajima Ki-201 Karyu – j-aircraft.org

Ki-201, Nakajima
Messerschmitt Me 262
Ki-201
Ki-201, Nakajima
World War II jet aircraft of Japan